Gendlin is a Jewish surname. Notable people with the surname include:

 Eugene Gendlin (1926–2017), American philosopher
 Vladimir Gendlin (1936–2021), Russian boxing commentator and expert

Jewish surnames